The Volkswagen GX3 was a concept car created by project Moonraker, which was initiated by Stefan Liske, former director of group product strategy at Volkswagen. The GX3 was first shown at the 2006 Greater Los Angeles Auto Show. It was considered an unusual concept, since it was three-wheeled and sometimes considered more of a motorcycle concept than a concept car, but it did feature good performance for a projected cost of only about US$17,000.

The GX3 used a transverse-mounted 1.6 L I4 engine from the VW Lupo GTI. This engine gave the GX3 an output of 125 PS (92 kW) and 152 N·m (112 ft·lbf) of torque. The GX3 could go from 0–100 km/h in 5.7 seconds and had a top speed of 200 km/h (125 mph). It used a six-speed manual transmission.

The design of the GX3 was atypical, with a front double wishbone suspension, tubular steel space frame and laminated body panels. The concept was of a rare type, with two seats and three wheels. The GX3 lacked a roof or windshield, and was intended mainly for fair weather environments, as a "weekend car". The design of the interior was minimalist and functional.

There was considerable speculation as to possible production of the GX3; Volkswagen fueled this with the announcement that production would depend on the public reaction to the concept.

However, in spite of the positive public response, and intensive chassis development by Lotus Cars for production, Volkswagen later concluded that it would not be able to sell the GX3 without costly, and complex redesigns that would alienate Volkswagen's target market and increase price above the proposed US$17,000 base price.

The company cited possible safety issues that could have led to product liability lawsuits, and decided that the legal concerns made production as is impossible.

References
VW GX3 @ ConceptCarz.com
PCH Berlin-Los Angeles GmbH
Stefan Liske on xing

See also
List of motorized trikes
Polaris Slingshot

External links
The most brilliant trike ever made!

GX3